Suddenly the Blues is an album by saxophonist Leo Wright featuring performances recorded in 1962 for the Atlantic label.

Reception

AllMusic reviewer, David Szatmary, stated it was "More driving than Blues Shout", Wright's previous album.

Track listing
All compositions by Leo Wright, except as indicated
 "A Felicidad" (Antonio Carlos Jobim) - 2:37
 "Greensleeves (Traditional) - 2:45
 "Gensel's Message" - 4:10
 "The Wiggler" - 2:55
 "Tali" (Tom McIntosh) - 4:44
 "Dionysos" (Lalo Schifrin) - 3:07
 "Sassy Lady" (McIntosh) - 4:24
 "Willow Weep for Me" (Ann Ronell) - 4:21
 "Suddenly the Blues" - 5:07

Personnel 
Leo Wright - alto saxophone, flute
Kenny Burrell - guitar 
Ron Carter - bass
Rudy Collins - drums

References 

1962 albums
Leo Wright albums
Atlantic Records albums
Albums produced by Nesuhi Ertegun